(1860–1938) was a Japanese ophthalmologist known for his discovery of Takayasu's arteritis.

Graduated from Tokyo Imperial University in 1887 he worked at what was to become Kanazawa University School of Medicine in Kanazawa, Ishikawa. After moving to Beppu, Kyushu he died in November 1938.

References 
 http://www.jsvs.org/journal/abstract_en.php?bn=20031206&no=1 (corresponding Japanese page)
  - where you can find his picture.

1860 births
1938 deaths
Japanese ophthalmologists
University of Tokyo alumni